Agalinis divaricata is a flowering plant species in the genus Agalinis. It is commonly known as pineland false foxglove. A dicot, it grows in parts of Florida, Georgia and Alabama. It is in the Orobanchaceae (broomrape) family. It grows in dry longleaf pine forests and savannahs. The genus is hemiparasitic.

References

divaricata
Flora of Alabama
Flora of Florida
Flora of Georgia (U.S. state)
Taxa named by Alvan Wentworth Chapman